Adeniran Ogunsanya Street is a street located in Surulere local government area of Lagos State and lies next to Akangba. It is named after Adeniran Ogunsanya.

Adeniran Ogunsanya street is home to the popular Adeniran Ogunsanya Shopping Mall.

Adeniran Ogunsanya Shopping Mall
Adeniran Ogunsanya Shopping Mall also known as Leisure Mall is an ultramodern shopping mall located in Adeniran Ogunsanya Street. Built and commissioned by the then Military Governor of Lagos State, Brigadier-General Mobolaji Johnson in 1975, the shopping mall was later redeveloped in 2011 by the Babatunde Fashola-led government. Prior to its redevelopment in 2011, it had been known as "Adeniran Ogunsanya Shopping Centre" under the management of LSDPC (Lagos State Development and Property  Corporation). At this time, it housed several retail businesses such as "Ices Parlour" (a confectionery store) "Jack and Judy" (a school uniform outfit) Patabah bookstore, and "Omo Onikoyi" (a hair salon). It currently has a total area of about 22,000 square metres with over 150 shops, a car-pack that can contain over 300 cars, a lift, an escalator and other basic facilities.

See also

 Surulere

References

Geography of Lagos
Populated places in Lagos State
Streets in Lagos